The Christy Awards, established in 1999, are awarded each year to recognize fiction of excellence written from a Christian perspective with matters of faith at its core. Awards are given in several genres, including contemporary (stand-alone novels and series), historical, romance (contemporary and historical), suspense, and visionary. In addition, an award is given for first novel and young adult.

Designed to nurture and encourage creativity and quality in the writing and publishing of fiction written from a Christian worldview and showcase the breadth and depth of fiction choices available, The Christy Awards are named in honor of Catherine Marshall and her novel Christy.

In 2017, the Evangelical Christian Publishers Association (ECPA), an international non-profit trade organization, assumed ownership and administration of the award. Winners are chosen by industry insiders, including reviewers, editors, bookstore owners, and book buyers.

Winners and finalists

2000s

Allegory and Fantasy

Contemporary and General Fiction

First Novel

Futuristic

Historical Fiction

Lits

Romance

Suspense and Mystery

Visionary

Western

Young Adult

2010s

Book of the Year

Contemporary and General Fiction

First Novel

Historical Fiction

Romance

Contemporary

Historical

Mystery, Suspense, or Thriller

Short Form

Visionary

Young Adult

2020s

Book of the Year

First Novel

General Fiction

Historical Romance

Historical Fiction

Mystery and Suspense

Short Form

Visionary

Young Adult

Notes

References

External links 
Christy Awards home

American literary awards
Christian literature
Christy (novel)
Awards established in 2000
2000 establishments in the United States
English-language literary awards